K-9 is a 1989 American buddy cop action comedy film starring Jim Belushi and Mel Harris. It was directed by Rod Daniel, written by Steven Siegel and Scott Myers, produced by Lawrence Gordon and Charles Gordon, and released by Universal Pictures.

Belushi plays bad-tempered San Diego police detective Michael Dooley, who has been tagged for execution by a major international drug dealer named Ken Lyman (played by Kevin Tighe). To help, K-9 Sergeant Brannigan (played by Ed O'Neill) gives Dooley an unorthodox drug-sniffing police dog called "Jerry Lee" (named after rock-and-roll singer Jerry Lee Lewis). The duo attempt to put Lyman behind bars but Dooley quickly learns Jerry Lee is a mischievous smart aleck who works only when and how he wants to. Many of the film's gags revolve around Jerry Lee's playfully destructive episodes.

The film was followed by a K-9 film series, including two direct-to-video sequels, K-911 (1999) and K-9: P.I. (2002); as well as a television spin-off film titled K-9000, that was intended to be the pilot episode to a TV series that was not ordered.

Plot

San Diego Police Detective Michael Dooley leaves his unmarked police car to contact his girlfriend, Tracy, when a helicopter suddenly appears and opens fire on his car, which ignites. Presuming him dead, the assassins leave the scene. At the police station, Dooley argues with his lieutenant about the other night, refusing to take a partner; instead, he decides to get a police dog. At home, he finds Tracy with another man and spends the night in his personal car, a classic 1966 Ford Mustang convertible (he refers to it as a "'65"). The next day, Dooley coerces Freddie, an informant, into revealing that Ken Lyman, the drug lord Dooley has been after for two years, is responsible for the attack. Freddie gives Dooley a tip about a warehouse where Lyman’s drugs are, but it impossible to find it. Dooley ask his colleague Brannigan for a favor to loan him a k-9 that could him track Lyman’s drug shipment. Since Dooley helped him out, Brannigan returned the favor and found a K-9 aka German shepherd named 
Jerry Lee who is one of the best police dogs who can track down any drugs in a minute. Even though Dooley is reluctant to work with him, so he decided to give the dog a chance.

Dooley and Jerry Lee head to a warehouse assumed to be filled with drugs. When Jerry Lee ignores Dooley's orders, the workers laugh at him. Dooley is forced to leave after Jerry Lee finds only a marijuana joint when commanded to find drugs. The duo drive to a pub where Dooley stakes out Benny the Mule in an attempt to charge Lyman. When his cover is blown, Jerry Lee saves Dooley from a beating; with the dog's help, Dooley subdues Benny and learns the location of Lyman's next shipment. Meanwhile, Lyman kills Freddie and demands that his henchman Dillon kill Dooley before the shipment arrives.

At Dooley's apartment, Jerry Lee steals the spotlight after Tracy accepts Dooley's story that he rescued the dog from the streets. The next day, Dooley and Jerry Lee bond when they eat together and spy on Lyman. The two are nearly killed when someone shoots at them, and the two chase the assailant to an empty building. Jerry Lee leads Dooley to the man, who falls to his death after a fistfight with Dooley. In the man's car, Dooley finds a clue that leads him to an auto-dealer shop. There, Jerry Lee identifies a red Mercedes owned by Lyman, and Dooley learns from Halstead, the owner of the dealership, that he works for Lyman. Later, Jerry Lee falls in love with a poodle to the disapproval of its owner.

When Dooley returns home, he discovers Lyman has kidnapped Tracy. Infuriated, Dooley crashes a party  at Lyman's mansion and demands her return. Lyman pretends to know nothing, and Dooley is arrested by an officer from his own department and put in a squad car. Angry, Dooley's lieutenant calls him crazy.  When Jerry Lee's flatulence annoys the other officers, Dooley uses it to his advantage and escapes with the dog. As Dooley tells Jerry Lee how he met Tracy, he spots a truck driven by Halstead that is pulling a trailer with Lyman's Mercedes. Dooley purses the truck, and Halstead blows a tire. After Halstead shoots at Dooley, Jerry Lee stopped Halstead and arrested.

Meanwhile, in a stranded desert in San Diego, Lyman holds Tracy hostage in his limo and becomes suspicious when Halstead is late. Dooley arrives with the truck and trailer, which is revealed to be the next shipment of drugs. Not worrying about the case anymore, Dooley orders Lyman to surrender his girlfriend to him, or he will blow up the truck. Lyman calls Dooley's bluff, and a shootout ensues.  Dooley kills Lyman's henchmen Dillon and Jerry Lee chases Lyman as he runs for his helicopter. Unable to outrun the dog, Lyman shoots Jerry Lee; enraged, Dooley shoots at Lyman but misses.  Lyman is, instead, shot and killed by his associates who were waiting in the helicopter. Dooley and Tracy rush Jerry Lee to a hospital, where the reluctant surgeon operates. In the recovery room, Dooley delivers a eulogy to Jerry Lee, not knowing that he is alive. When the surgeon tells him he is going to be fine, Dooley responds in anger, thinking he was speaking to a dead dog. Jerry Lee licks Dooley's face out of love, making him give in.

To take a break from police work, Dooley, Tracy, Jerry Lee, and a poodle spend a vacation together in Las Vegas.

Cast

 Jim Belushi as Detective Michael Dooley
 Mel Harris as Tracy
 Kevin Tighe as Lyman
 Ed O'Neill as K-9 Sergeant Brannigan
 James Handy as Lieutenant Byers
 Sherman Howard as Dillon
 Daniel Davis as Halstead
 Cotter Smith as Gilliam
 John Snyder as Freddie
 Pruitt Taylor Vince as Benny 'The Mule'
 Marjorie Bransfield as Car Dealership Reciptionist
 William Sadler as Don, Car Salesman

The role of "Jerry Lee", though credited in the movie credits as being played by Jerry Lee, was actually played by more than one dog, including backups and stand-ins.

Production

Filming
K-9 was filmed in and around the San Diego and San Fernando Valley areas of California from August to October 1988.  Locations included the Hotel del Coronado in Coronado, and the Golden Hills Cafe in the Golden Hills neighborhood.

Music

Soundtrack
 "Main Title (Theme from Jaws)"
Music composed by John Williams / Courtesy of MCA Records
 "Iko Iko"
Written by Barbara Ann Hawkins (as Hawkins), Joe Jones (as Jones), Rosa Lee Hawkins (as Hawkins), 
Marilyn Jones (as Johnson), Sharon Jones (as Jones) and Jessie Thomas (as Thomas) of The Dixie Cups / Performed by Amy Holland
 "I Got You (I Feel Good)"
Written by James Brown / Performed by James Brown / Courtesy of PolyGram Special Products, a division of
PolyGram Records, Inc.
 "Oh Yeah"
Written by Boris Blank and Dieter Meier / Performed by Yello / Courtesy of PolyGram Special Products, a division of
PolyGram Records, Inc.
 "Car Wash"
Written by Norman Whitfield / Performed by Rose Royce / Courtesy of MCA Records

Release

Home media
K-9 was released to home video in early 1990, followed by a DVD release 16 years later, on October 24, 2006. It was re-released along with its sequels in a collection as "K-9: The Patrol Pack" on January 17, 2010.

It was initially released on Blu-ray disc in the U.K. in 2017 by Fabulous Films and then in the United States on May 15, 2018.

Reception

Critical response
On Rotten Tomatoes, which aggregates both contemporary and modern reviews, the film has an approval rating of 22% based on 9 reviews, with an average rating of 4.1/10. On Metacritic it has a score of 44% based on reviews from 11 critics, indicating "mixed or average reviews". Audiences surveyed by CinemaScore gave the film a grade A− on scale of A to F.

Kevin Thomas of the Los Angeles Times praised the actors but not the routine plot. Thomas wrote, "It's enjoyable, thanks not only to its charismatic duo, but also to the skilled comedy direction of Rod Daniel." Stephen Holden of The New York Times stated it has "no shred of credibility", yet contains "cutesy, surefire dog tricks" and a "breezy pacing". Roger Ebert of the Chicago Sun-Times gave the film "2 stars". Rita Kempley of The Washington Post complimented Jerry Lee's performance.

Sequels and spin-off
 
K-911 is a 1999 American buddy cop action-comedy sequel film released direct-to-video. It was directed by Charles T. Kanganis and stars James Belushi as Detective Michael Dooley.

K-9: P.I. is a 2002 American buddy cop action-comedy sequel film released direct-to-video. It was directed by Richard J. Lewis and stars James Belushi as Detective Michael Dooley.

K-9000 is a 1991 American science fiction crime action spin-off film released as television film. It was directed by Kim Manners and stars Chris Mulkey as Detective Eddie Monroe.

See also

 List of media set in San Diego

References

External links

 
 
 
 
 

1989 films
1989 action comedy films
American buddy cop films
American action comedy films
Fictional portrayals of the San Diego Police Department
Films about dogs
Films set in San Diego
Films shot in San Diego
American police detective films
1980s police comedy films
Universal Pictures films
Films directed by Rod Daniel
1980s buddy cop films
Films scored by Miles Goodman
Police dogs in fiction
1980s English-language films
1980s American films